You? Me? Us? is the ninth studio album by British singer-songwriter Richard Thompson released in April 1996 via Capitol Records.  It was Thompson's fourth album for the label, his fifth with Mitchell Froom producing and his second to be nominated for a Grammy Award.  Thompson's son from his first marriage (to Linda Thompson) Teddy sings backing vocals on disc 2.

Music
The album is split into two discs.  Disc one, Voltage Enhanced, is recorded with a band and is largely electric. Disc two, Nude is largely acoustic with just violin or Danny Thompson's double bass for accompaniment. Two songs, "Razor Dance" and "Hide It Away", are included on both discs.  The songs on you? me? us? are notable for metrical complexity and richness of lyric, and for Thompson's guitar work.  His acoustic guitar playing is highlighted on the Nude disc.  His electric playing is to the fore on "Put It There Pal" and "Bank Vault In Heaven" on the Voltage Enhanced disc.

Track listing
All songs written by Richard Thompson.

Disc 1 – "Voltage Enhanced"
"Razor Dance"
"She Steers By Lightning"
"Dark Hand Over My Heart"
"Hide It Away"
"Put It There Pal"
"Business On You"
"No's Not A Word"
"Am I Wasting My Love On You?"
"Bank Vault In Heaven"
"The Ghost Of You Walks"

Disc 2 – "Nude"
"Baby Don't Know What To Do With Herself"
"She Cut Off Her Long Silken Hair"
"Hide It Away"
"Burns Supper"
"Train Don't Leave"
"Cold Kisses"
"Sam Jones"
"Razor Dance"
"Woods Of Darney"

Personnel
Richard Thompson – guitar, vocals, mandolin, hurdy-gurdy

Additional musicians
Mitchell Froom – keyboards
Tchad Blake – guitar
Simon Nicol – guitar
Jerry Scheff – bass guitar
Pete Thomas – drums
Jim Keltner – drums
Christine Collister – backing vocals
Teddy Thompson – backing vocals
Danny Thompson – double bass
Suzie Katayama – cello
Sid Page – violin

References
Richard Thompson – The Biography by Patrick Humphries. Schirmer Books. 0-02-864752-1
richardthompson-music.com

Notes

External links
Salon.com interview about You? me? us?

1996 albums
Richard Thompson (musician) albums
Albums produced by Tchad Blake
Albums produced by Mitchell Froom
Capitol Records albums